Eid Hassan Doha is an Egyptian Emeritus Professor of Numerical Analysis and Approximation Theory at the Cairo University. He is an elected fellow of African Academy of Sciences, the head of the department of  Mathematics at Cairo University and the Head of Promotion Committee of Research Assessment for Associate Professorships – Supreme Council of Egyptians Universities.

Early life and education 
Eid Hassan Doha was born on November 14, 1945. He attended University of Cairo from B.Sc. to PhD level. He obtained his B.Sc. in Pure and Applied Mathematics in 1967. He obtained his M.Sc and PhD in 1972 and 1977 respectively.

Career 
Eid Hassan Doha began his career in 1967 as a demonstrator of mathematics at the Faculty of Science, University of Cairo in Egypt. He became as assistant lecturer after his Master's programme in 1972. After his PhD, he became a full lecturer in the same university. However, he left the University of Cairo for Al-Khartoum, Sudan, a branch of the University of Cairo in 1979 and spent a year. In 1980, he moved to Emirates University, Al-Ain in the United Arab Emirates where he became associate professor after three years (1983). In 1990, he moved to Female Education, Girl’s College of Education, Jeddah, Kingdom of Saudi Arabia where he became professor of Numerical Analysis and Approximation Theory.

Award and memberships 
Eid Hassan Doha became a member of the Mathematical and Physical Society of Egypt in 1977 and a member of the American Mathematical Society in  1990. In 1993, he became a member of the Egyptian Mathematical Society and eventually became their Vice president.   He was the Chairman of the Egyptian National Evaluation Committee for promoting assistant professors in Mathematics from 2004 to 2006. Also in 2004, he was elected as a member of the Egyptian National Committee of Mathematics (Academy of Scientific Research and Technology, Cairo).  He was awarded an Excellence Research Paper by the Egyptian National Committee of Mathematics (Academy of Scientific Research and Technology, Cairo, Egypt in 2005.  He became a Fellow of the African Academy of Sciences in 2006. He received Excellence Scientific Research in Basic Sciences" from Cairo University in 2007 and a member of the International Association for Mathematics and Computers in Simulation.

References 

Egyptian scientists

Academic staff of Cairo University
Scientists from Cairo
Cairo University alumni
1945 births
Living people
Fellows of the African Academy of Sciences